Land of Pleasure is the second studio album by Australian rock band Sticky Fingers, released through Sureshaker in August 2014. Land of Pleasure debuted at number 3 on the ARIA Charts.

Reception
Shane Arnold from Music Feeds said the album was "Slicker and more cohesive than Caress Your Soul" and called the album "a simply delicious mix of rock, reggae and electronica". Ben Madden from Project U called the album "excellent" saying "All the songs on this album belong, and while not being as fluid as Caress Your Soul, it surpasses the aforementioned album in terms of sheer musical quality. Each track screams for attention, and even the laidback tracks such as 'Feast Your Eyes' pack a little more punch than the relaxed tracks on the debut".

Arne Sjostedt from Sydney Morning Herald gave the album 4/5 saying "There are some very satisfying grooves on this album. Playing a mix of sounds that settle around dub reggae, a little psychedelia and hints at electro, these lads show up to the party."

Track listing

 "Land of Pleasure" – 3:01
 "Feast Your Eyes" – 2:34
 "Just for You" – 3:50
 "Rum Rage" – 4:12
 "Gold Snafu" – 3:39
 "Liquorlip Loaded Gun" – 5:09
 "Fake a Smile" – 2:15
 "Show No Shade" – 3:40
 "If You Go" – 3:47
 "Velvet Skies" (ft. Lyall Moloney) – 4:49
 "Dreamland" – 4:05
 "Lazerhead" – 5:54
 "Gasoline Can Man" (bonus track) – 1:52

Charts

Certifications

Release history

References

2014 albums
Sticky Fingers (band) albums